Carl Bertrand Westerby Roberts CMG (born October 13, 1948) is an Antiguan and Barbudan diplomat and is the former High Commissioner of Antigua and Barbuda to the United Kingdom, with concurrent accreditations as Ambassador of Antigua and Barbuda to France, Germany, Italy and Spain.

Career
In 1967 he joined the Cable & Wireless (WI) Ltd.
From 1995 to 1997 he was General Manager of Cable  & Wireless (WI) Ltd. in Montserrat.
From 1997 to 2002 he was Chief Executive of Cable  & Wireless (WI) Ltd. in Dominica. 
From 2002 to 2004 he was Chief Executive of Cable  & Wireless (WI) Ltd. in St Kitts & Nevis.  
On  he was commissioned High Commissioner to London.
On 8 December 2004 Roberts presented his Letters of Credence to Queen Elizabeth II.
From 2004 to 2014 he was High Commissioner to London and concurrently Ambassador to Berlin, Madrid, Moscow, Rome, Paris, where he was Permanent Representative to the UNESCO and in Geneva he was Deputy Permanent Representative to the World Trade Organization.
In the 2012 New Year Honours, Roberts was appointed Companion of the Order of St Michael and St George (CMG)

References

1948 births
Living people
Ambassadors of Antigua and Barbuda to Russia
High Commissioners of Antigua and Barbuda to the United Kingdom
Antigua and Barbuda diplomats
Companions of the Order of St Michael and St George